Chandrakala (1950/1951 – 1999) was an Indian actress.

Chandrakala may also refer to:

 Chandrakkala, a type of virama or diacritical mark in Indian scripts
 Chandrakala A. Hate (1903–1990), Indian academic
 Chandrakala (dessert), an Indian sweet